DYXS-TV is a commercial relay television station owned by ABS-CBN Corporation. Its studio and transmitter are located at Barangay Manlucahoc, Sipalay City, Negros Occidental. This station is currently inactive.

ABS-CBN TV-26 Local Programs 
TV Patrol Negros (simulcast from TV-4 Bacolod)
Kapamilya Winner Ka! (simulcast from TV-4 Bacolod with relay on TV-10 Iloilo, TV-9 Kalibo, TV-21 Roxas and TV-44 Antique) 
MAG TV Na, Amiga! (simulcast from TV-4 Bacolod with relay on TV-10 Iloilo, TV-9 Kalibo, TV-21 Roxas and TV-44 Antique)
Agri Tayo Dito

See also
 List of ABS-CBN Corporation channels and stations

Television stations in Negros Occidental
Television channels and stations established in 2010
ABS-CBN stations